Mukhsin Mukhamadiev (born 21 October 1966) is a football manager and former player.

Career

Club
Born in Dushanbe, Mukhamadiev played club football for Pomir Dushanbe, Pakhtakor, Lokomotiv Moscow, Ankaragücü, Spartak Moscow, Lokomotiv Nizhny Novgorod, Austria Wien, Torpedo Moscow, Shinnik Yaroslavl, Buxoro, Dinamo Samarqand, Arsenal Tula and Vityaz Podolsk.

International
Mukhamadiev represented both Tajikistan and Russia at international level.

Managerial
After retiring from playing at Vityaz Podolsk in 2002, Mukhamadiev was appointed as one of the club coaches in 2003, before being appointed manager in 2006. Mukhamadiev managed Vityaz Podolski until 2008 before joining Rubin Kazan as sporting director until 2012.
In July 2013, Mukhamadiev was appointed as manager of the Tajikistan national team, managing them for two-years before resigning on 16 July 2015. After leaving his post with Tajikistan, Mukhamadiev was part of Bakhtiyar Bayseitov's coaching staff at Ordabasy for the first half of the 2016 season.
On 31 October 2016, Mukhamadiev was appointed as manager of FC Istiklol for the 2017 season. On 18 September 2017, Mukhamadiev led Istiklol to their sixth Tajik League title with a 5–0 victory over Panjshir.
After being knocked out of the 2018 AFC Cup at the group stage, manager Mukhamadiev resigned as manager of FC Istiklol six-days later on 22 May 2018, with Alisher Tukhtaev being appointed as acting head coach.

On 9 June 2019, Mukhamadiev was appointed as manager of Uzbekistan Super League club FK Buxoro.

Career statistics

International

International goals

Managerial
 Only competitive matches are counted.

Honours

Club
Spartak Moscow
 Russian Top League (1): 1994

References

1966 births
Living people
Soviet footballers
Tajikistani footballers
Tajikistani expatriate footballers
Tajikistan international footballers
Tajikistani football managers
Dual internationalists (football)
Russian footballers
Russian expatriate footballers
Russia international footballers
Russian football managers
Russian expatriate football managers
Tajikistani emigrants to Russia
Association football forwards
CSKA Pamir Dushanbe players
Vakhsh Qurghonteppa players
FC Lokomotiv Moscow players
MKE Ankaragücü footballers
FC Spartak Moscow players
FC Lokomotiv Nizhny Novgorod players
FK Austria Wien players
FC Torpedo Moscow players
FC Shinnik Yaroslavl players
Buxoro FK players
FK Dinamo Samarqand players
FC Arsenal Tula players
FC Vityaz Podolsk players
Soviet Top League players
Russian Premier League players
Süper Lig players
Austrian Football Bundesliga players
Expatriate footballers in Turkey
Tajikistani expatriate sportspeople in Turkey
Russian expatriate sportspeople in Turkey
Expatriate footballers in Austria
Tajikistani expatriate sportspeople in Austria
Russian expatriate sportspeople in Austria
Expatriate footballers in Uzbekistan
Tajikistani expatriate sportspeople in Uzbekistan
Tajikistan national football team managers
PFK Nurafshon managers
Russian expatriate sportspeople in Uzbekistan